Friends of Lulu was a non-profit, national charitable organization in the United States, which operated from 1994–2011 to promote readership of comic books by women and the participation of women in the comic book industry.

Membership was open to all persons. Friends of Lulu additionally sponsored the Lulu Awards and administered the Women Cartoonists Hall of Fame.

The organization took its name from Little Lulu, the comic strip character created by Marjorie Henderson Buell in 1935. In the comics, Lulu often tries to break into the boys' clubhouse, where girls aren't allowed.

History
In the early 1990s, comic book professionals Trina Robbins, Heidi MacDonald, Deni Loubert, Anina Bennett, Liz Schiller and Jackie Estrada banded together to share frustrations, information and aspirations for women in the male-dominated comics industry, and held the first "Friends of Lulu" meeting at a comics convention. Co-founder Trina Robbins recalls that a Cherry Poptart lookalike contest sponsored by Comic-Con International was the "last straw" that inspired the creation of the organization.

In 1994 Friends of Lulu started an amateur press association which lasted three issues.

In 1997 the first annual Lulu conference and Lulu awards were held in California.

In 2000, Friends of Lulu was awarded a grant from the Xeric Foundation to self-publish Friends of Lulu: Storytime.

In 2003, the organization published an anthology entitled Broad Appeal.

In September 2007, Valerie D'Orazio volunteered to fill the empty president of the national board of directors of Friends of Lulu.

In August 2010, an interim Board of Directors was reestablished.

In June 2011, the IRS revoked the organization's tax-exempt status as a non-profit. The group ceased operations shortly afterwards.

Past presidents of the organization include Katie Merrit, owner of retail store Green Brain Comics, and Shannon Crane.

Lulu Awards

The Lulu Awards, presented annually at Comic-Con International in San Diego, California, from 1997 to 2009, bestowed the Lulu of the Year trophy for overall work; with additional awards, variously over the years, including the Kimberly Yale Award for Best New Talent; the Volunteer of the Year Award; the Women of Distinction Award and induction into the Women Cartoonists Hall of Fame.

Publications 
Friends of Lulu published a number of books, including:
 How to Get Girls (Into Your Store) (1997) — guide for comics shop owners on how to make their stores more female-friendly
 Friends of Lulu Presents: Storytime (2001)
 Broad Appeal (2003) — anthology of comics by women artists
 The Girls' Guide to Guys' Stuff (2007) — an anthology of over 50 women cartoonists including Roberta Gregory, Abby Denson, and Debbie Huey

See also
 Female comics creators
 List of female comics creators
 List of feminist comic books
 List of Lulu Award winners
 Portrayal of women in American comics

References

External links
Friends of Lulu Homepage

Comics awards
 
Comics-related organizations
Organizations for women writers
Literary awards honoring women
Organizations established in 1994
Women's organizations based in the United States
Women and comics
Organizations disestablished in 2011
1994 establishments in the United States
2011 disestablishments in the United States